Bartonella jaculi is a bacterium from the genus Bartonella which was isolated from the blood of Rodentia.

References

External links
Type strain of Bartonella jaculi at BacDive -  the Bacterial Diversity Metadatabase

Bartonellaceae
Bacteria described in 2013